Thomas Dakin (23 November 1829 – date of death unknown) was an English first-class cricketer.

Dakin was born at Sheffield in November 1829. He played first-class cricket for Yorkshire from 1851–1862, making five appearances. He made three appearances in 1851, against an All England Eleven, Surrey and Lancashire. He made a further appearance against an All England Eleven in 1852, before making a final first-class appearance a decade later against Surrey. He scored a total of 54 runs in his five matches, with a high score of 16.

References

External links

1829 births
Date of death unknown
Cricketers from Sheffield
English cricketers
Yorkshire cricketers